The Beat Ballad Show Tour was a 1960 tour of Scotland by singer Johnny Gentle, backed by the Beatles (billed as Johnny Gentle and his Group). It was the first concert tour by the Beatles.

Background
On 10 May, the Beatles competed with other local Liverpool bands in an audition for talent manager Larry Parnes for a chance to back singer Billy Fury on a summer tour called "Idols on Parade". There was also an opportunity for the second-best band to back singers Duffy Power and Johnny Gentle in a tour of Scotland from May 20–28, 1960. However, Beatles drummer Tommy Moore arrived late. Drummer Johnny Hutch was asked to sit in with the band. A rumor has surfaced over the years saying that Parnes and Fury were also unimpressed with bassist Stuart Sutcliffe, and the Beatles were turned down for either spot. Larry Parnes has stated that he found nothing wrong with Stuart Sutcliffe, and that it was the elderly looking drummer Tommy Moore that he thought was wrong for the group.

However, a few days later, Parnes contacted Beatles manager Allan Williams, as Gentle needed a backing group for a Scottish tour beginning 20 May. The Beatles were the only group Williams could book at such short notice, and they got the job.

The Tour
For the tour, the Beatles adopted stage names—John Lennon became known as "Johnny Lennon", Paul McCartney was "Paul Ramon", George Harrison was "Carl Harrison", Stu Sutcliffe was "Stuart de Staël", and Tommy Moore was "Thomas Moore". The band was very under-rehearsed, barely knowing the songs they were to perform with Gentle. Gentle and the Beatles were friendly with each other on the tour, and Lennon contributed to a song Gentle was writing, "I've Just Fallen For Someone".

The exact songs played on the tour are unknown. It is known that the Beatles performed by themselves before Gentle came on the stage. Harrison would remember performing "Teddy Bear" and "Wear My Ring Around Your Neck" by Elvis Presley. Other sources report that they played "It Doesn't Matter Anymore"  and "Raining in My Heart" by Buddy Holly, "I Need Your Love Tonight" by Elvis Presley, "Poor Little Fool" by Ricky Nelson, "(I Don't Know Why) But I Do" by Clarence "Frogman" Henry, "C'mon Everybody" by Eddie Cochran, and "He'll Have to Go" by Jim Reeves.

Dates

Tour band
Johnny Gentle – vocals
Johnny Lennon – rhythm guitar, vocals
Paul Ramon – rhythm guitar
Carl Harrison – lead guitar
Stuart de Staël – bass guitar
Thomas Moore – drums

See also
 List of the Beatles' live performances

References

Sources
 

1960 concert tours
Concert tours of the United Kingdom
The Beatles concert tours
1960 in British music
1960 in Scotland
May 1960 events in the United Kingdom